Mizuho Financial Strategy Co.,Ltd. (株式会社みずほフィナンシャルストラテジー) is a company that focuses on providing advisory services. It is the successor of Mizuho Holdings, Inc. (MHI), which was a Japanese bank holding company established in 2000  through the consolidation of Fuji Bank, Dai-Ichi Kangyo Bank, and the Industrial Bank of Japan. MHI was reorganized on April 1, 2002, when its subsidiaries were realigned and rebranded with the Mizuho name. On March 12, 2003, MHI became a wholly owned subsidiary of Mizuho Financial Group. On October 1, 2005, MHI ceased to be a bank holding company when all of its subsidiaries, including Mizuho Bank, Ltd. and Mizuho Corporate Bank, Ltd., were transferred to the direct control of Mizuho Financial Group. MHI was subsequently renamed Mizuho Financial Strategy Co., Ltd.. The company's headquarters are located in Tokyo, Japan.

See also
 Mizuho Financial Group
 Financial Services

References

Banks established in 2000
Companies formerly listed on the London Stock Exchange
Financial services companies based in Tokyo
Holding companies based in Tokyo
Financial Strategy
Holding companies established in 2000
Japanese companies established in 2000